Star Trek: The Experience was a attraction, which opened in January 1998 at the Las Vegas Hilton (now Westgate Las Vegas) in Las Vegas, Nevada, United States, based on the Star Trek entertainment franchise. The pavilion underwent a major renovation in 2004 to add the Borg Invasion 4-D attraction  allowing guests to encounter the Borg. Star Trek: The Experience was operated by entertainment management company Cedar Fair after its June 2006 purchase of Paramount Parks from the CBS Corporation. It closed in September 2008 and was scheduled to reopen in the Neonopolis Mall on May 8, 2009, in time for the premiere of the Star Trek film. The opening was then pushed back to 2010 and then in 2011, it was announced that Cedar Fair had lost the license.

Individual attractions

The History of the Future Museum

After purchasing a ticket, visitors walked through a museum that included numerous items from Star Trek history. It also featured several video display devices and a timeline of Star Trek events. Later, there were displays for each of the major alien races, which included the Borg, Klingons, and Ferengi. Ticket prices eventually increased to allow visitors unlimited rides throughout the day.

The last section of the museum was a hallway that served as the attraction queues. The left side was for Borg Invasion 4-D, and the right side was for Klingon Encounter. Klingon Encounter held 27 people, while Borg Invasion 4-D held 48 people. Each show was constructed so that those "in the back" for the first part of the show would, in turn, likely end up in the front for the second half of either show.

The closure of The Experience also resulted in the closure of The History of the Future Museum in 2008. Both were no longer available for visitors to enjoy.

Klingon Encounter
Note: The exact attraction experience varied as a result of live performer input.

Initially, the visitors entered a small room with a depiction of "outer space." A small television in the upper right corner of the room displayed scenes from several Star Trek films. The group then entered a smaller, dimly lit waiting area for a traditional simulator ride. Hosts directed their attention to a safety demo for the shuttlecraft simulator ride. A few moments later, the televisions flickered, and the lights went out. Flashing lights followed, along with transporter sound effects and a rush of cold air. When the lights returned after less than 3 seconds, the group was standing on a transporter pad in the Transporter Room, which was approximately twice the size of the original small room they had entered. Guests were greeted by Starship personnel, who informed them they were now aboard the Enterprise-D,  in the transporter room as seen in Star Trek: The Next Generation.

On the transporter pad, a uniformed Starfleet officer asked for the leaders of the group and directed them away for instruction. Transiting through a typical Star Trek corridor, the guests arrive at the Bridge of the Enterprise-D where it was explained that the visitors were beamed aboard the Starship Enterprise to "what you would call the future". Commander Riker appeared on the main viewscreen, explaining that Captain Picard disappeared the moment the group beamed aboard the Enterprise and thus one member of the group must be Picard's ancestor. A Klingon Commander named Korath used a time-rift to abduct Picard's ancestor and erase him from the timeline. Starfleet Intelligence dispatched the Enterprise to intercept the Klingons' transporter beam and rescue the entire group. Riker directs the group to board a shuttlecraft with Geordi La Forge to escape the temporal rift and return all guests to their original time. 

Starfleet personnel led the group out of the Bridge through a Star Trek Turbolift. While the group was in the turbolift, the Klingons attacked the Enterprise and the turbolift entered a free fall. When the turbolift came to a rest the group exited into another transit corridor where personnel led them to the shuttle bay for escape. While on the bridge guests were permitted to take photographs.

The group boarded the shuttlecraft which was in a 270-degree domed theater with four degrees of motion base platform.  The shuttle ride began with a battle between the Enterprise and Klingon vessels. The shuttle then returned through the temporal rift to present-day Las Vegas. The shuttle landed at the Las Vegas Hilton right next to the "motion simulators" shuttles the visitors were originally waiting to enter when they were "beamed off" at the start of the story. Captain Picard thanked the crew for restoring his existence. He said, "While only one of you is my ancestor, each of you hold that same opportunity for the future. Guard it well." Typically, a custodian led the group to an elevator and then out to the Deep Space Nine Promenade and Quark's Bar. When the custodian led the group to the elevator, there was a television set that showed a "news" report where the military mentions that the shuttles over Las Vegas were weather balloons.  

Upon exiting the shuttlecraft, the guests transit through a corridor where they enter the Promenade from Deep Space Nine

This simulation ride closed along with The Experience in 2008.

The motion simulator was developed by McFadden Systems, Inc.

Borg Invasion 4-D

Like Klingon Encounter, Borg Invasion draws the visitor into a Trek-themed adventure. While Klingon Encounter is based on the Star Trek: The Next Generation series (which also introduced the Borg), this one is based upon the Star Trek: Voyager series. Once more, this adventure includes the use of costumed actors and video and audio participation of several Trek series cast members.

Unlike Klingon Encounter which uses sets that duplicate (or come close to doing so) those on the ship in which it occurs, namely USS Enterprise-D, Borg Invasion does not occur on sets familiar to Trek viewers — the USS Voyager is not used. Instead, the action occurs at another site designed and created exclusively for the Hilton: a Starfleet space station. The 'Star Trek Borg Encounter', its twin attraction in north Germany opened at the 'Space Center Bremen' on February 12, 2004, in the city of Bremen, north Germany. The attraction closed down along with the 'Space Center' on September 26, 2004, due to low visitor numbers. The 4D cinema with its 250 seats was dismantled in 2008.

Immersion of the visitors into the storyline has no equivalent to the high-tech beaming on board the Enterprise-D used in Klingon Encounter. Here it is accomplished only by a quick introduction of the state of danger to the participants with the on-screen Trek series cast members Kate Mulgrew, Robert Picardo, and numerous other actors. The plot involves the participants in several close encounters with Borg drones.

Though using no ride simulator, this adventure culminates in a space battle with the Borg Queen (played by the original Actress from the Star Trek movies, Alice Krige) via a 3-D movie with corresponding physical effects including water vapor, wind, and being "stabbed" with a Borg probe (thus the “4D” in the title).

While Klingon Encounter goes to great effort to utilize Trek staples to justify the incorporation of 21st-century humans into a futuristic, far-off adventure (beaming, a spaceflight, and time travel) no such effort is made to justify participation in the plot of Borg Invasion 4-D.

Secrets Unveiled
A special behind-the-scenes tour was also available for visitors starting in August 2005. The tour followed a basic script and was timed to allow access to parts of the attraction while they were unoccupied by other guests enjoying the rides. Many of the tour guides also included trivia questions and allowed for Q&As during the tour.

Starting at the main entrance, the tour guide explained the general history of the attraction and some anecdotes regarding the large model ships and items in the museum. As the guests were guided to the corridor housing the ride queues, they went backstage for the first time. Throughout the tour guests were taken through a series of backstage areas such as wardrobe and makeup and were also allowed to explore the sets used for the rides, allowing them more time to more thoroughly examine the details than allowed during the rides and revealing some of the secrets of how the show was operated to allow guests to become lost in the world of the 24th century.

Photography was not allowed on the tour due to copyright and licensing agreements with Viacom, the then-owner of the rights to the Star Trek franchise.

At the conclusion of the tour, guests were invited to sign a guestbook and were given a certificate containing the guests' name, the date, the tour number, and the signature of the tour guide. Guests were also allowed to keep the VIP badge they wore throughout the tour.

There were only five backstage tours on a given day, and they were not included in the cost of general admission.

Closure

Following the sale of Paramount Parks to Cedar Fair in 2007, a decline in admissions along with failed negotiations between Cedar Fair and the Las Vegas Hilton brought about the attraction's closure on September 1, 2008.

The closing ceremony was held on September 1, 2008. The public was invited to attend the ceremony, which was presented in the tradition of a naval decommissioning ceremony. Giving the keynote at the closing was Suzie Plakson, who introduced all the members of Star Trek: The Experience staff. April Hebert, who played the Vulcan T'pril, was introduced last as the longest serving cast member of Star Trek: The Experience and given the United Federation of Planets banner. Avery Brooks and Chase Masterson were also in attendance for the closing ceremony, and Garrett Wang made a brief appearance at Quark's shortly before closing. Chad Boutte, Operations Manager of Star Trek: The Experience, gave the final speech with the final words "live long and prosper".

Moving and sale
Mayor Oscar Goodman stated in a news conference on October 16, 2008 that a possible deal to move and reopen core elements of STTE was being negotiated between CBS and Rohit Joshi, developer of the Neonopolis Mall. The first phase of the re-opening was rumored to coincide with the theatrical release of the next Star Trek film on May 8, 2009.

Despite the announced license deal, the remnants of the attraction, including the Quark's Bar sign, wardrobe and furniture from the recreated set pieces, were either sold during a warehouse sale in April 2010 or a larger auction in August 2010. Anything deemed unsalable, due to size or damage, or that remained unsold at the end of the warehouse sale, was destroyed.  Under the terms of Paramount's original license, the various items (ships, models etc.) constructed for the attraction reverted to Paramount's ownership upon the closure of the attraction.

The plans for the moving of Star Trek: The Experience stalled when Neonopolis lost the license due to noncompliance with the terms of the contract due to loss and lack of funding. Joshi's entire quick-save project was all occurring in the long shadow of the September 2008 stock market crash and resulting Great Recession, then just getting underway.

As of 2022, no announcements regarding a new, permanent Star Trek attraction to replace Star Trek: The Experience have been made.

Design

Star Trek: The Experience was designed by Landmark Entertainment.  It received an Award for Outstanding Achievement from the Themed Entertainment Association in 1998.

See also

 List of amusement rides based on television franchises
 Star Trek exhibition

References

External links

 Star Trek: The Experience 360 Virtual Tour
"Future Attractions". Starlog. April 1998 #249.

2008 disestablishments in Nevada
Cedar Fair amusement parks
Simulator rides
Works based on Star Trek
Tourist attractions in the Las Vegas Valley
Amusement rides introduced in 1998
Amusement rides manufactured by McFadden Systems, Inc.
Amusement rides that closed in 2008
4D films
Outer space in amusement parks
1998 establishments in Nevada
Westgate Las Vegas